The Islamabad Capital Territory (ICT) Administration, generally known as Islamabad Administration, is the civil administration as well as main law and order agency of the Federal Capital. ICT Administration operates under Presidential Order No. 18 of 1980, which confers powers of the Provincial Government upon the Chief Commissioner Islamabad.

Executive 
The Executive Officers of ICT Administration are:-
 Capt. (Retd.) Muhammad Usman, Chief Commissioner, Islamabad
 Muhammad Ahsan Younas, Inspector General of Islamabad Police
 Irfan Nawaz, Deputy Commissioner / District Magistrate

Departments 
There are 06 directorates and 25 departments working under ICT Administration. All departments report to the concerned Directorate under the supervision of Chief Commissioner Islamabad, the executive head of the district management. List of departments / agencies under ICT Administration is as under:-
 Islamabad Police
 Islamabad Traffic Police
 District Magistrate Office
 Revenue Department
 Labour Department
 Industries Department
 Cooperative Societies Department
 Auqaf Department
 Civil Defense Department
 Food Department
 Excise & Taxation Department
 Local Government & Rural Development Department
 Zakat & Usher Department
 Agriculture Department
 Livestock & Dairy Development Department
 Water Management Department
 Soil Conservation Department
 Fisheries Department
 Women Programme Officer
 Islamabad Employees Social Security Institution
 Islamabad Boys Scout Association
 Islamabad Sports Board
 Islamabad Wildlife Management Board
 District Attorney
 Dengue Fever Control Center
 District Polio Control Room (DPCR) - ICT
 Department of Libraries
 ICT Market Committee

See also 
 Capital Territory Police
 Islamabad Traffic Police
 Capital Development Authority
 Islamabad Capital Territory
 Islamabad High Court

References

External links 
 ICT Administration - Official Website
 Prices in Pakistan - PriceToday
 Mobile Prices in Pakistan - Mijmobile

Pakistan federal departments and agencies
Government of Pakistan
Islamabad Capital Territory
Islamabad